Chase Collegiate School was a nonsectarian private day school offering education for children from pre-kindergarten through grade 12. The school was on a  campus in Waterbury, Connecticut. On October 2, 2017, the school announced that it had been purchased by York Education Group, a for-profit entity which owns multiple schools. Due to the COVID-19 pandemic, the school announced its closure on August 13, 2020.

, the enrollment was 276 students: 61 Lower School (age 3 pre-kindergarten through 5th grade), 75 Middle School (6th through 8th grades), and 140 Upper School (high school).

History
Chase was a co-educational school formed by the merger of two single-sex schools. The first was a girls' school established in 1865 as Collegiate Institute for Young Ladies, later St. Margaret's School for Girls.  The second was a boys' school established in 1912 as the McTernan School for Boys.  Upon merging in 1972, the combined school was called St. Margaret's-McTernan, until being renamed to Chase Collegiate School in 2005.

Notable alumni
Grant Goodeve - television actor
Steven Erlanger - journalist 
Joan Bennett - actress 
Lucia Chase - founding patron of the American Ballet Theatre 
Jayne Meadows - stage, film, and television actress
Gene Tierney - actress

References

External links

 Chase Collegiate School

1865 establishments in Connecticut
Educational institutions established in 1865
1912 establishments in Connecticut
Educational institutions established in 1912
Private elementary schools in Connecticut
Private middle schools in Connecticut
Private high schools in Connecticut
Schools in New Haven County, Connecticut
Buildings and structures in Waterbury, Connecticut